The 1977–78 Yugoslav First Basketball League season was the 34th season of the Yugoslav First Basketball League, the highest professional basketball league in SFR Yugoslavia.

Classification 

The winning roster of Bosna:
  Rođeni Krvavac
  Anto Đogić
  Predrag Benaček
  Boško Bosiočić
  Nihad Izić
  Ratko Radovanović
  Mladen Ostojić
  Žarko Varajić
  Mirza Delibašić
  Dragan Zrno
  Sabit Hadžić
  Svetislav Pešić
  Sabahudin Bilalović
  Sulejman Duraković

Coach:  Bogdan Tanjević

Scoring leaders
 Dragan Kićanović (Partizan) - 894 points (34.4 ppg)
 Dražen Dalipagić (Partizan) - 875 points (33.7 ppg)
 Branko Skroče (Zadar) - 779 points (30.0 ppg)
 Branko Kovačević (Metalac Valjevo) - 717 points (27.6 ppg)
 Mirza Delibašić (Bosna) - 694 points (26.7 ppg)

Qualification in 1978-79 season European competitions 

FIBA European Champions Cup
 Bosna (champions)

FIBA Cup Winners' Cup
 Radnički Belgrade (Cup finalist)

FIBA Korać Cup
 Partizan (2nd)
 Jugoplastika (3rd)
 Brest Olimpija (4th)
 Cibona (5th)

References

Yugoslav First Basketball League seasons
Yugo
Yugo